is a Japanese manga series written and illustrated by Miki Yoshikawa. It was serialized in Kodansha's shōnen manga magazine Weekly Shōnen Magazine from February 2012 to February 2017, with its chapters collected in 28 tankōbon volumes. The series was published digitally in English by Crunchyroll starting in 2013 and was licensed in North America by Kodansha USA in 2015.

An eight-episode television drama adaptation was broadcast on Fuji TV from August to September 2013. A 12-episode anime television series adaptation by Liden Films was broadcast from April to June 2015.

Plot

Ryu Yamada is known as a delinquent in his high school. He has been bored with his classes after one year of attending school. One day, he accidentally falls from a flight of stairs onto Urara Shiraishi, the ace student at the school. Yamada wakes up to find he has swapped bodies with her. The two try to reverse the change and discover kissing triggers the body swap. On the suggestion of student council vice-president Toranosuke Miyamura, they revive the Supernatural Studies club. The supernatural-phenomenon-obsessed Miyabi Itou soon joins the club. The club encounters other "witches" with different powers are activated with a kiss on the lips. A transfer student, Kentaro Tsubaki, becomes a part of the club after nearly causing a fire to the old schoolhouse. Upon discovering the identity of the seventh witch, Rika Saionji, Yamada supposedly has his memories of the witches erased, but it instead affects the witches and the students involved. While the student council tries to impede his progress, Yamada restores the memories of the witches with a kiss, and gathers the seven witches for a ceremony where he wishes for the powers to go away. He confesses his love to Urara and they become a couple.

He is recruited to the new student council where he learns he still has his witch copying power, but there are more witches. Although the student council tries to shield each other from the powers while discovering and allying with the witches, they find themselves facing opposition from students controlled by the Shogi (japanese chess) club, which has male students with new kinds of witch powers. The student council receives a vote of no confidence and must face a recall election. In the process of infiltrating the Japanese chess club, Yamada learns of a witch who was connected to his past. He works a deal with childhood friend-turned-rival Ushio Igarashi where he wishes for his memories to return; in exchange, Ushio would take seventh witch Nancy's ability. When the Japanese chess club continues to manipulate the campaign, Yamada uses his copied seventh witch power to erase the recent events, but Ushio beats him to the punch and they are both forgotten by the students.

Yamada returns to the Supernatural Studies club as the school has to deal with new witches following the new school year. He also learns there are gaps in his and his schoolmates' memories of what happened at the end of his first school year, including those of whom he was dating at the time. Yamada then tries to find out the truth of what happened. He ultimately gathers the male witches to hold a ceremony to restore everyone's memories. As he goes through his senior year of high school, he plans to apply to a prestigious university. However, when Urara suddenly disappears from his life along with the witches powers and everyone else's memories of her, Yamada discovers she was the original witch. Urara had agreed to the witch powers in order to have a relationship with Yamada, but on the condition her memories of him to be erased again when she leaves school. However, when she returns at graduation, Yamada finds a way to get her to remember again.

Ten years later, Yamada has become a successful businessman who is looked up to by his coworkers and keeps in touch with his high school friends, but has yet to propose to Urara. The two get married and some years later, share their story with their two children.

Production
Manga author Miki Yoshikawa's previous work, Flunk Punk Rumble (Yankee-kun to Megane-chan) ran in Kodansha's Weekly Shōnen Magazine from 2006–2011, with a total of 211 chapters. Her editor suggested for her next project that she write a one-shot for Bessatsu Shōnen Magazine. She developed two stories: a prototype story for Yamada-kun and The Demon's Classroom. The second story was initially chosen, but became difficult to run because the main character was a grade school girl. The prototype Yamada story eventually became the first chapter for Yamada-kun.

In the Natalie interview, Yoshikawa said that she had thought of the body swapping idea in the Yankee-kun days, and had researched some medical books on the differences between men and women, both physically and emotionally, but generally went with it because she liked the idea. "It just kind of came to me, but I was wondering how a guy finding himself in a girl's body would react, and the reverse". She treats a body-swapped character as an entirely different character. At Anime Expo 2015, she said that she initially thought about gender swapping first but later rejected that as a potential magic power.

When it was noted that the main characters for both of her works were delinquents, Yoshikawa replied that those types of characters came easily for her, as she grew up in the lower end of Tokyo. The characters and their names are not based on her friends so that they can act crazy. At Anime Expo 2015, she said that the characters reflect different aspects of herself. She also said that the Yamada-kun characters go to a different school from the ones in Yankee-kun but that they live in adjacent neighborhoods.

With regards to drawing, she tries to vary each kiss, but mostly uses the side angle to make sure it comes through. With regards to kisses between members of the same gender, she replied that wasn't intended to target any specific demographic but just "an inevitable outcome." At the time of Anime Expo, she said she had five assistants. She does her drawing by hand in black-and-white, and uses the computer for the filling in colors. She spends about half of her time on story, and the other half on actual drawing.

Media

Manga

Written and illustrated by Miki Yoshikawa, Yamada-kun and the Seven Witches was serialized in Kodansha's shōnen manga magazine Weekly Shōnen Magazine from February 22, 2012, to February 22, 2017, after running for exactly 5 years. Kodansha collected its chapters in 28 tankōbon volumes, released from June 15, 2012, to April 17, 2017.

On October 26, 2013, Crunchyroll announced a partnership with Kodansha where it would distribute chapters digitally to 170 countries using a new service called Crunchyroll Manga. This includes an English translated version. The series is licensed for a North American release by Kodansha USA, who began releasing the series in 2015. In July 2015, Yoshikawa attended Anime Expo as a guest of honor where she promoted her series.

Television drama
A live-action drama began airing on August 10, 2013 on Saturdays on Fuji TV at 11:10pm. It stars Yusuke Yamamoto as the title character Ryū Yamada, and Mariya Nishiuchi as Urara Shiraishi. Its theme song is "Time Machine Nante Iranai" by former AKB48 headliner Atsuko Maeda. She described the song as "cheerful and fun" and hopes it will liven up the show. Sponsors include Samsung, which included the show's characters in their related commercials broadcast at the time.

Episode list
The average rating for the series was 6.3%.

Anime
An animated promotional video (PV) was released by Liden Films on August 26, 2013. The video was directed by Seiki Takuno. Ryu Yamada was voiced by Ryōta Ōsaka, and Urara Shiraishi was voiced by Saori Hayami. In June 2014, Liden Films launched a website with news that it would be producing an original anime DVD (OAD). The OAD has two installments: the first was released on December 17, 2014 bundled with the manga volume 15, and the second is bundled with volume 17 for May 15, 2015. They were advertised as featuring all seven witches as well as hot springs scenes.

In November 2014, Liden films announced plans to produce a TV anime series with the voice characters to reprise their roles from the OAD project. The series was directed by Tomoki Takuno, with Fumiaki Usui serving as assistant director. The series writer is Michiko Yokote, and the chief animation director and character designer is Eriko Iida. Yota Tsuruoka served as sound director and the music was composed by Masaru Yokoyama.

A 12-episode anime television adaptation produced by Liden Films and directed by Tomoki Takuno aired in Japan between April 12 and June 28, 2015.

The first DVD and Blu-ray Disc box sets of the anime television series included a crossover anime short Yamada-kun to 7-nin no Majo x Yankee-kun to Megane-chan adapted from the manga by the same author.

Crunchyroll released the series on Blu-ray and DVD with an English dub. Funimation later released on home video in July 2017. Medialink holds the license to the series in Southeast Asia and South Asia.

OAD

Episode list

Reception
By February 2017, the manga had sold over 3.85 million copies in Japan.

Works cited
  "Ch." is shortened form for chapter and refers to a chapter number of the Yamada-kun and the Seven Witches manga by Miki Yoshikawa. Original Japanese version published by Kodansha. English version published by Crunchyroll Manga.
  山田くんと７人の魔女 ― スポニチ (Yamada-kun and the Seven Witches) drama, 2013, 8 episodes.

Notes

References

External links
 Anime website archived as of September 22, 2019 
 Yamada-kun and the Seven Witches at Crunchyroll Manga 
 

Anime series based on manga
Crunchyroll anime
Harem anime and manga
Fiction about body swapping
Fiction about memory erasure and alteration
Funimation
Japanese high school television series
Liden Films
Medialink
Romantic comedy anime and manga
School life in anime and manga
Shōnen manga
Supernatural anime and manga
Television series about witchcraft
Witchcraft in anime and manga